Titus is a monotypic genus of East African ground spiders containing the single species, Titus lugens. It was first described by O. Pickard-Cambridge in 1901, and has only been found in Zimbabwe.

References

Gnaphosidae
Spiders described in 1901
Spiders of Africa